Noluthando Mayende-Sibiya was the former Minister of Women, Youth, Children and People with Disabilities under South African President Jacob Zuma, from 2009 to 2014.

See also

African Commission on Human and Peoples' Rights
Constitution of South Africa
History of the African National Congress
Politics in South Africa
Provincial governments of South Africa

References

Date of birth missing (living people)
Living people
21st-century South African politicians
Government ministers of South Africa
Year of birth missing (living people)